Rain, Steam and Speed is the fourth and final studio album by the New Zealand band, The Mutton Birds. It was released in 1999.

The album coincided with the departure of the bass guitarist, vocalist and sometime song contributor Alan Gregg, and also the guitarist David Long. It was released as the Mutton Birds remained based in London seeking a breakthrough on the UK market.

Track listing
(All songs by Don McGlashan)
"As Close as This" — 4:21
"Winning Numbers" — 3:46
"Small Mercies" — 4:37
"Green Lantern" — 4:02
"The Falls" — 5:05
"Last Year's Shoes" — 4:27
"Jackie's Song" — 3:43
"Pulled Along by Love" — 4:30
"Goodbye Drug" — 6:19
"Hands Full" — 3:28
"Ray" — 6:24

Personnel
Don McGlashan – vocals, acoustic guitars, EBow guitar, piano, organ, euphonium
Ross Burge – drums, tambourine
Alan Gregg – bass guitar
Chris Sheehan – bass guitar, electric guitar

Additional personnel
 Tony Fisher — backing vocals
 David Mitchell — Ebow guitar
 Stuart Nesbit — pedal steel
 Tony Kiley — congas

References

The Mutton Birds albums
1999 albums